Robert C. Wertz (August 18, 1932 – May 5, 2009) served for 32 years as a Republican member of the New York State Assembly.

Life
Wertz was born in Kew Gardens, Queens. He attended Sewanhaka High School in Floral Park, New York. He received a Bachelor of Arts degree from Alfred University and a Juris Doctor degree from Albany Law School. Wertz served in the United States Marine Corps Reserve for six years with the 2nd Battalion 25th Marines.

Wertz worked for State Farm Insurance, after which he was a Senior Attorney in Appellate Division of the New York State Supreme Court.  From 1967 through 1970, he served as Town Attorney for the Town of Smithtown, New York.

He was a member of the New York State Assembly from 1971 to 2002, sitting in the 179th, 180th, 181st, 182nd, 183rd, 184th, 185th, 186th, 187th, 188th, 189th, 190th, 191st, 192nd, 193rd and 194th New York State Legislatures. He left office in 2002, after losing to John J. Flanagan in a primary election for the New York State Senate.

Wertz and his wife Dorothy had three children: Mary, Donna, and Robert Wertz II.

References

External links

 
 

1932 births
2009 deaths
Albany Law School alumni
Republican Party members of the New York State Assembly
People from Floral Park, New York
People from Kew Gardens, Queens
United States Marine Corps reservists
20th-century American politicians